Chawpi Chawpi (Quechua chawpi central, middle, the reduplication indicates that there is a group or a complex of something, Hispanicized spelling Chaupi Chaupi) is a mountain in the Wansu mountain range in the Andes of Peru, about  high. It is situated in the Arequipa Region, La Unión Province, Puyca District. Chawpi Chawpi lies northwest of Ikmaqucha and southwest of the mountains Yuraq Punta and Tintaya.

References 

Mountains of Peru
Mountains of Arequipa Region